Drove Cottage Henge (sometimes called Hunter's Lodge Henge) is a scheduled monument in the Priddy parish of Somerset, England. The site is a ceremonial Neolithic location. Since this henge is one of only around 80 henges throughout England, it is considered to be nationally important.

Description 
Drove Cottage Henge is situated in a valley. In the northern portion of this central area is a low-lying mound in front of the exit, which appears as a break in the outside bank.

Jodie Lewis noted in 2005 that "Examples of southerly and north-north-westerly orientations, apropos Stockwood and Hunter's Lodge, are documented at other Class I henge sites, but are not common". Harding and Lee in 1987 said of it "HUNTERS LODGE, Priddy ST 559 498: Sub-oval enclosure, surviving as an earthwork, situated at the head of a shallow valley."

This whole site has become hard to see because repeated ploughing has heavily damaged the archaeological site, including the turf cover.

Nearby archaeological sites 
Four barrows are relatively close to Drove Cottage Henge. One is a disc barrow and a scheduled monument (designation #13840). Another is a bowl barrow and a scheduled monument (designation #13871). Another, also a bowl barrow, is a scheduled monument (designation #13872). The final barrow is probably a bowl barrow, but it may be a spoil dump. It too is a scheduled monument (designation #13873).

See also 

 Neolithic Europe

References

External links 
 A view of the site

Scheduled monuments in Mendip District
Henges
Mendip Hills